Tarxien is a town in the South Eastern Region of Malta. Its population stood at 8583 in March 2014.

The town is most notable for the Tarxien Temples, a megalithic temple complex which is among the oldest freestanding structures on Earth. It forms part of a UNESCO World Heritage Site.

Etymology
The etymology of the village may be a corruption of Tirix, meaning a large stone, similar to those used for the village's noted temples. The village motto is Tyrii Genure Coloni ("The Phoenicians created me").

Demographics
Tarxien's population stood at 7,724 villagers in December 2008, which increased to 8,583 by March 2014. When the summer comes, the heat drives most of the citizens of Ħal Tarxien to the seaside villages of Malta, often bringing down the population of the village to about two-thirds of what it is during the colder months.

Main sights

Prehistoric temples

The oldest temple here is said to date back to about 3600 BCE. The temples feature various statues and reliefs of animals, including goats (for which Malta is noted) and pigs. Most notable of the statues found in the Temples are about 2.5 m in height, and are said to represent a sort of Mother Goddess. There are several of these statues scattered around the various temples, and are thought to represent fertility. There was also one of three small baked clay figurines in the form of what is said to be a priest that was found here.

Churches
The parish church of Ħal Tarxien is dedicated to the Annunciation of Our Lady, hence the Tarxinizi (the people of Ħal Tarxien) consider the Blessed Virgin Mary, particularly at Her Annunciation as the Patron and Protector of their town and its whole population. The church was elevated to the status of parish in 1592, making it one of the oldest parishes of Malta. A key part of Ħal Tarxien culture is the feast of the Annunciation, whose feast is celebrated in late May or first Sunday of June. It is celebrated with religious celebrations and liturgical services at the parish church, and publicly with street decorations, band marches in the village streets and large aerial and ground firework displays.

The second largest church in town is dedicated to the Resurrection of Christ better known by the locals as "Ta' l-Erwieħ". The word means "of the souls" and it is used due to the old cemetery that surrounds the church. This church is right next to the renowned Tarxien Neolithic Temples and is visited by many tourists as many of the prehistoric remains were also found in the mentioned cemetery.

There are two other small chapels in Ħal Tarxien. These are dedicated to St. Bartholomew and St. Mary respectively.

There is also another chapel which is housed in the convent of the Sisters of Charity. This is dedicated to 'Our Lady of the Immaculate Conception'. The same congregation have a school.

There is also another church dedicated to St. Nicholas of Tolentino and a convent which belongs to the Augustinian Friars.

Local Council
The Ħal Tarxien local council members are:

Joseph Abela Galea (Mayor, PL)
Darlene Vella (Vice Mayor, PL)
Christian Pace (PL)
Neil Portelli (PL)
Tommy Debattista (PL)
Anabelle Marmara (PN)
Ismael Dalli (PN)

Band clubs
The only band club in Ħal Tarxien is the Għaqda Mużikali Marija Annunzjata founded in 1862. The Ħal Tarxien Band Club main aims are to promote the music culture amongst the locals of Ħal Tarxien and to co-organise the external titular festivities in honour of the Annunciation of Our Lady, Patroness of Ħal Tarxien, held annually during the last week of May.
The Annunciation Band Club (L-Għaqda Mużikali Marija Annunzjata) http://www.tarxienbandclub.com

There is also another club, a social one, dedicated to Our Lady of Catholic Doctrine.
Our lady of Christian Doctrine Social Club(Ghaqda Socjali Madonna Tad-Duttrina) https://web.archive.org/web/20110208044335/http://madonnatadduttrina.com/

Fireworks organization
Ghaqda tan-nar San Gabriel    www.stgabrielfireworkstarxien.com
Ghaqda tan-nar Madonna Tad-Duttrina

Notable people from Tarxien

Former Prime Minister of Malta Dominic Mintoff lived in Ħal Tarxien and died at his residence there on 20 August 2012.
Former Minister Magistrate Dr. Joseph Cassar.
Former Speaker of the House of the Representatives and Ambassador of Malta to the Vatican, Chev. Dr. Jimmy Farrugia lived at Ħal Tarxien until his death in 2007.
Chev. Raffaele Bonnici Calì, painter, restorer and local historian lived in Ħal Tarxien until his death in 2002.
Thea Garrett, singer. She represented Malta at Eurovision Song Contest 2010.
 Melvin J. Gouder, Consultant Ophthalmic Surgeon with special interest in Diabetic eye disease and vitreoretinal surgeon. Author of the book "The Retina, A Guide to self assessment.  https://www.springer.com/gp/book/9783030485900

Twin cities
 Ovindoli, Italy
 Veliko Tarnovo, Bulgaria
 Saint-Élix-le-Château, France

Gallery

Main roads
Misraħ ir-Repubblika (Republic Square)
Misraħ is-Suq (Market Square)
Triq Birżebbuġa (Birzebbuga Road)
Triq Brittanika (Britannic Street)
Triq Ħal Tarxien (Tarxien Road)
Triq id-Dejma (Dejma Street) 
Triq il-Kbira (Main Street) 
Triq il-Palma (Palm Street)
Triq Paola (Paola Road)
Triq San Anard (St Leonard Road)
Triq Santa Marija (St Mary Street)
Triq Tal-Barrani (Outer Road)
Triq il-Knisja (Church Street)
Triq iż-Żejtun (Żejtun Road)
Triq Marju Schembri (Mario Schembri Street)

References

External links

Tarxien Local Council
The Tarxien Temples - Article from Grip magazine (Maltese publication)

 
Towns in Malta
Local councils of Malta